The Niger national football team represents Niger in international football through the Nigerien Football Federation, a member of Confederation of African Football (CAF). Niger plays in the colors of the flag of Niger, white, green and orange. Their nickname comes from the Dama gazelle, native to Niger, the Hausa name of which is Meyna or Ménas The Dama appears on their badge in the colors of the national flag.

History
Although one of the less successful sides in the strong West Africa region, Niger has produced a couple of noteworthy runs in qualifying tournaments.

One of their best performances was in the 1982 FIFA World Cup qualifiers in which Niger eliminated Somalia and Togo on the away goals rule, but were beaten by Algeria in the third round where only eight teams were left. Notable players in this run included Jacques Komlan, Hassane Adamou and Moussa Kanfideni.

In 1990, they set a record by thrashing Mauritania 7–1 in continental qualifiers, the highest positive score margin for the Mena.

In the 2004 African Nations Cup qualifiers, Niger won all their home games (including a win over Guinea) to finish on nine points, just three short of qualification.

The Niger squad is also plagued by financial concerns, which have caused them to withdraw from international tournaments on more than one occasion. The Nigerien Football Federation would have turned to fundraising to pay for their trip to the 2010 African Cup of Nations in Angola, had they qualified.

On 10 October 2010, Niger earned a shock 1–0 win over Egypt at home in the 2012 African Cup of Nations qualification.

Despite a failed run for AFCON 2010, Niger hosted and won the UEMOA Tournament in November 2010, and followed up with their first ever qualification for the African Nations Championship in February 2011.

After home wins over South Africa and Sierra Leone, on 8 October 2011 Niger qualified for the Africa Cup of Nations for the first time in its history, despite losing 3–0 in Egypt. Niger, South Africa and Sierra Leone all ended with nine points, but Niger qualified thanks to their superior head-to-head record against their rivals.

At the 2012 African Cup of Nations, Niger was placed in Group C alongside co-hosts Gabon, Tunisia and Morocco. In their opening match, Niger lost 2–0 to Gabon, while against Tunisia in Libreville, Niger trailed 1–0 on an early goal from Youssef Msakni in which he dribbled his way through for a fine goal after just four minutes. William N'Gounou, however, then made history by scoring Niger's first ever goal at the African Cup of Nations. A 1–1 draw looked likely, but Issam Jemâa's goal would eliminate Niger from the tournament. In the final match, Niger faced Morocco in a match featuring two sides already eliminated from the tournament. Younès Belhanda scored on an assist from Marouane Chamakh just 11 minutes from time to give Morocco a 1–0 victory.

Later in 2012, Niger repeated its success in African Nations Cup qualifiers by beating Guinea in a two-legged series to qualify for the 2013 Africa Cup of Nations. Guinea won the first match 1–0, but Niger won 2–0 in the second leg. Goalscorers Mohamed Chikoto and Issoufou Boubacar had sent Niger to another African Cup of Nations tournament.

In their first match at the 2013 Africa Cup of Nations, Niger lost 1–0 to Mali at the Nelson Mandela Bay Stadium in Port Elizabeth. Mali captain Seydou Keita handed his nation the hard-fought victory five minutes before the end of the encounter. Niger then earned their first point ever at the African Cup of nations after holding DR Congo to a 0–0 draw. In the third match, Ghana outclassed Niger 3–0 to reach the quarter-finals as Group B winners. Niger finished bottom of the group.

On 22 May 2014, Niger played a friendly match against Ukraine, marking the first ever match against a European nation. Oumarou Bale scored in the 56th minute, cancelling out a 20th-minute goal from Ivan Ordets before Ukraine won on a goal from Taras Stepanenko as the match finished 2–1.

Results and fixtures

2022

2023

Coaching history

  Patrice Neveu (1999–2000)
  Jean-Yves Chay (2000)
  Yeo Martial (2002–2003)
  Bana Tchanile (2006–2007)
  Hamey Amadou (2007–2008)
  Dan Anghelescu (2008)
  Frederic Costa (2008–2009)
  Harouna Doula Gabde (2009–2012)
  Rolland Courbis (2012)
  Gernot Rohr (2012–2014)
  Cheick Omar Diabate (2014–2015)
  François Zahoui (2015–2019)
  Jean-Guy Wallemme (2019–2020)
  Jean-Michel Cavalli (2020–present)

Players

Current squad
The following players were called up for the 2023 Africa Cup of Nations qualification matches against Tanzania and Uganda on 4 and 8 June 2022.

Caps and goals are correct as of 8 June 2022, after the match against Uganda.

Recent call-ups
The following players have been called up for Niger in the last 12 months.

DEC Player refused to join the team after the call-up.
INJ Player withdrew from the squad due to an injury.
PRE Preliminary squad.
RET Player has retired from international football.
SUS Suspended from the national team.

Records

Players in bold are still active with Niger.

Competitive record

FIFA World Cup record

Africa Cup of Nations record

African Nations Championship record

Head-to-head record

References

External links

 Niger Football Federation website

 
African national association football teams